Dmitri Aleksandrovich Prigov (5 November 1940 in Moscow – 16 July 2007 in Moscow) was a Russian writer and artist. Prigov was a dissident during the era of the Soviet Union and was briefly sent to a psychiatric hospital in 1986.

Early life and career

Born in Moscow, Russian SFSR, Prigov started writing poetry as a teenager. He was trained as a sculptor, however, at the Stroganov Art Institute in Moscow and later worked as an architect as well as designing sculptures for municipal parks.

Artistic career

Prigov and his friend Lev Rubinstein were leaders of the conceptual art school started in the 1960s viewing performance as a form of art. He was also known for writing verse on tin cans.

He was a prolific poet having written nearly 36,000 poems by 2005.
For most of the Soviet Era, his poetry was circulated underground as Samizdat. It was not officially published until the end of the Communist era. His work was widely published in émigré publications and Slavic studies journals well before it was officially distributed.

In 1986, the K.G.B arrested Prigov, who performed a street action by handing poetic texts to passers-by, and sent him to a psychiatric institution before he was freed after protests by poets such as Bella Akhmadulina.

From 1987 he started to be published and exhibited officially, and in 1991 he joined the Writers' Union. He had been a member of the Artists' Union from 1975.

Prigov took part in an exhibition in the USSR in 1987: his works were presented in the framework of the Moscow projects "Unofficial Art" and "Modern Art". In 1988 his personal exhibition took place in the USA, in Struve's Gallery in Chicago. Afterwards his works were many times exhibited in Russia and abroad.

Prigov also wrote the novels Live in Moscow and Only My Japan, and was an artist with works at the Moscow Museum of Modern Art. He had many strings to his bow writing plays and essays, creating drawings, video art and installations and even performing music.

Prigov, together with philosopher Mikhail Epstein, is credited with introducing the concept of "new sincerity" (novaia iskrennost' ) as a response to the dominant sense of absurdity in late Soviet and post-Soviet culture. Prigov referred to a "shimmering aesthetics" that (as explained by Epstein) "is defined not by the sincerity of the author or the quotedness of his style, but by the mutual interaction of the two."

In 1993 Prigov was awarded Pushkin Prize of Alfred Toepfer Stiftung F.V.S. and in 2002 he won Boris Pasternak Prize.

Dmitri Prigov died from a heart attack in 2007, aged 66, in Moscow. He had been planning an event where he would sit in a wardrobe reading poetry while being carried up 22 flights of stairs at Moscow State University by members of Voina Group.

In 2011 Hermitage Museum presented an important monographic exhibition of Prigov's art in Venice during 54th Biennale.

Spelling of his name
Prigov's name in his native Russian Cyrillic lettering, Дми́трий Алекса́ндрович При́гов, has been rendered in English in various ways, with variations in the spelling of his first and middle names:
 Dimitri Prigov – Associated Press, The New York Times
 Dimitrii Aleksandrovich Prigov
 Dimitrij Aleksandrovich Prikov, Russian Literature, a periodical
 Dmitry Aleksandrovich Prigov – Encyclopædia Britannica
 Dimitry Prigov – The St. Petersburg Times (English language, Russia) The Moscow Times

Selected filmography
Khrustalyov, My Car! (1998)
Taxi Blues (1990)

References

External links
The End(s) of Russian Poetry: An Interview with Dmitry Prigov by Philip Metres
Dimitry Alexandrovich Prigov, Soviet-Era Avant-Garde Poet and Artist, Rest in Peace an overview that includes some Prigov poems
Russia’s leading conceptualist poet has died poet Ron Silliman provides a useful memento to Prigov, with links to pieces on Prigov, including Silliman's own blog-essay from 22 March 2006
 Biography of Dmitri Prigov 
 Bibliography of poetry in English translation
 Prigov PennSound page with sound recording of "Alphabets"
 Prigov poems tr. into English at Jacket

1940 births
2007 deaths
Writers from Moscow
Soviet Nonconformist Art
Russian male poets
Russian male novelists
Pushkin Prize winners
Russian contemporary artists
20th-century Russian poets
20th-century novelists
Soviet dissidents
20th-century Russian male writers
Kandinsky Prize
Stroganov Moscow State Academy of Arts and Industry alumni